Marcel Bernard defeated Jaroslav Drobný 3–6, 2–6, 6–1, 6–4, 6–3 to win the men's singles tennis title at the 1946 French Championships.

Seeds

Draw
1946 French Championships draw.

References

French Championships (tennis) by year – Men's singles
1946 in French tennis